Philippe Lejeune (born 13 August 1938) is a French professor and essayist, known as a specialist in autobiography. He is the author of numerous works on the subject of autobiography and personal journals. He is a cofounder of the Association pour l'autobiographie et le patrimoine autobiographique (Association for Autobiography and Autobiographical Heritage) created in Paris in 1992.

In this sense, Lejeune tried to establish a basic theory that allows scholars to better classify this popular genre beginning by providing a definition of autobiography: "[it is] the retrospective record in prose that a real person gives of his or her own being, emphasizing the personal life and in particular the 'story of life'." He also formulated the underlying concept of this narrative form: "In order to create an autobiography, the author enters into a pact or contract with the readers, promising to give a detailed account of his or her life, and of nothing but that life."

So the autobiography is characterized by the dual approach of introspection and a claim for truth. Nevertheless, he concedes that there are multiple factors (memory deficiencies, untruthfulness or excessive candor, the chosen narrative method etc.) that might constrain the wish to bring one's own life into a readable form.

Novelist and filmmaker Alain Robbe-Grillet, upon writing down his own life in Le Miroir qui revient (1985, English translation by Jo Levy: Ghosts in the Mirror, 1988), opposed Lejeune's concept of the autobiographical pact, which sparked a lengthy controversy about the concept among French intellectuals.

Works 
 1971: L'Autobiographie en France
 1975: Le Pacte autobiographique 
 1980: Je est un autre. L'autobiographie de la littérature aux médias
 1986: Moi aussi
 1989: On Autobiography, translated by Katherine Leary (U of Minnesota Press 1989)
 1990 «Cher cahier...» Témoignages sur le journal personnel
 1990: La Pratique du journal personnel
 1993  Le Moi des demoiselles. Enquête sur le journal de jeune fille
 1997: Un journal à soi, ou la passion des journaux intimes
 1998: Pour l'autobiographie
 2000: Les Brouillons de soi
 2000: «Cher écran...» Journal personnel, ordinateur, Internet
 2005: Signes de vie (Le pacte autobiographique, 2) (2005)
 2006: Le Journal intime. Histoire et anthologie
 2009: English translation by Katherine Durnin: On Diary  (University of Hawai'i Press 2009)
 2013: Autogenèses. Brouillons de soi 2

References

French autobiographers
20th-century French writers
21st-century French writers
1938 births
Living people